The Most Blessed Order of Setia Negara Brunei, also translated as The Most Blessed Order of Loyalty to the State of Brunei, is an order of Brunei. It was established on 29 November 1959 by Sultan Omar Ali Saifuddien III.

The order consists of four classes:

Recipients

First Class 

 Unknown – Abdul Rahman – Speaker of Legislative Council
 Unknown – Suyoi Osman – Minister of Development
 Unknown – Lim Jock Seng – Minister of Foreign Affairs and Trade II
 Unknown – Mustappa Sirat – Minister of Communications
 Unknown – Ali Apong – Minister of Culture, Youth and Sports
 Unknown – Abu Bakar Apong – Minister of Home Affairs
 1976 – Marianne E. Lloyd-Dolbey – Personal Secretary to Sultan Omar Ali Saifuddien III
 2011 – Yasmin Umar – Minister of Energy
 2016 – Zulkarnain Hanafi – Minister of Health
 2018 – Isham Jaafar – Minister of Health
 2018 – Abdul Mokti – Minister at the Prime Minister's Office
 2018 – Amin Liew – Minister of Finance and Economy II
 2018 – Erywan Yusof – Minister of Foreign Affairs II
 2018 – Suhaimi Gafar – Minister of Development
 2018 – Mat Suny – Minister of Energy and Industry
 2018 – Hamzah Sulaiman – Minister of Education
 2018 – Mutalib Mohd Yusof – Minister of Communications
 2022 – Nazmi Mohamad – Minister of Culture, Youth and Sports
 2022 – Romaizah Mohd Salleh – Minister of Education
 2022 – Shamhary Mustafa – Minister of Transport and Infocommunications
 2022 – Ahmaddin Abdul Rahman – Minister of Home Affairs

Second Class 

 Unknown – Marsal Maun – Menteri Besar
 Unknown – Yusuf Abdul Rahim – Menteri Besar
 Unknown – Abdul Momin Ismail – Menteri Besar
 Unknown – Isa Ibrahim – Minister at the Prime Minister's Office
 Unknown – Ibrahim Mohd Jahfar – Speaker of Legislative Council
 Unknown – Alam Abdul Rahman – Speaker of Legislative Council
 1962 – Jaya Rajid – Commissioner of Police

Third Class 

 2000 – Lim Jock Hoi – Secretary-General of ASEAN
 2010 – Adina Othman – Deputy Minister of Culture, Youth and Sports
 2010 – Othman Uking – Member of the Legislative Council
 2010 – Bahrin Mohd Noor – Assistant Senior Commissioner of Police
 2010 – Abdul Wahab Omar – Acting Senior Commissioner of Police
 2018 – Husaini Matzin – Senior Police Superintendent
 2018 – Zaini Abdul Rahim – Senior Superintendent of Police

Fourth Class 

 Unknown – Brigadier General Wardi – Commander of the Royal Brunei Air Force
 Unknown – Brigadier General Shahril Anwar – Commander of the Royal Brunei Air Force
 Unknown – Brigadier General Sharif – Commander of the Royal Brunei Air Force
 2002 – Brigadier General Abdul Razak – Deputy Minister of Defence 
 2012 – Brigadier General Khairul – Commander of the Royal Brunei Land Forces

References 

Orders, decorations, and medals of Brunei
Awards established in 1959
1959 establishments in Brunei